Mandai massacre refers to the general massacre of the Bengalis of Mandwi village near Agartala in the Indian state of Tripura on 8 June 1980, by tribal insurgents. According to official figures 255 Bengalis were massacred in Mandai, while foreign presses, independent sources and eyewitnesses put the figure anywhere between 350 and 400. Many of the victims had their heads crushed and their limbs severed. The children were spiked through. Pregnant women had their stomachs slit open. The Amrita Bazar Patrika described the Mandwi massacre as My Lai massacre put into shade. According to Major R. Rajamani, the commander of the Indian army contingent that arrived on 9 June, the My Lai massacre was not even half as gruesome as in Mandwi.

Background 
Mandwi was an obscure village located about 30 km north east of Agartala. The name of the village was incorrectly spelled as Mandwi in the land records. The village is inhabited by mostly Tripuri and the minor Bengali are residing there who are either shopkeepers or running other business.
it has been politically unstable since then, and always been on the verge of turmoil since then.

Events 
On the night of 6 June, separatist insurgent group lay out a blueprint of mass destruction. From the night of 6 June, armed insurgents began cordoning off the nontribal localities. From the morning of 7 June, news of arson, violence and murder began to spread. The Bengalis who stayed deep in the tribal pockets felt intimidated and started to leave for safety. Thousands of Bengalis took shelter near the National Highway 44. The BDO of Jirania, had opened a relief camp at Khayerpur School and started administering initial relief to the Bengali refugees. Shankar Narayan, the District Magistrate of West Tripura was intimated by that time and he asked BDO of Jirania to provide the refugees chira and gur.

From the afternoon of 7 June, the situation worsened. In the evening there were reports of large scale arson and looting in Jirania block. At 7:00 p.m. Sharma rushed to the District Magistrate office where he appraised Additional District Magistrate M. L. Dasgupta of the situation, who requisitioned two companies of the army. The army units however were given orders of flag march only. In the meantime Sharma received reports that the situation had turned grave in Champaknagar and the rioters were committing arson on the Bengali villages in the foothills of [(Baramura)[Hatai Kotor]].

On 8 June, at 3:00 a.m., Satyendra Chakraborty, the LAMPS manager of Mandwi and Sachindra Saha, a CPI(M) leader reported at the B.D.O. office that more than 500 Bengalis in Mandwi have been cordoned off and the armed Tripuris are about to kill them. Many Bengalis had taken shelter at the police outpost in Mandwi, which remained unmanned.

At 6:00 a.m., a contingent of Rajasthan Armed Constabulary and a platoon of Tripura Armed Police proceed towards Mandwi from Jirania. On their way they found an entire village on flames in Purba Noabadi. After dousing the flames, they proceeded towards Mandwi. By the time they reached Mandwi all the houses and huts were reduced to ashes, except the LAMPS building. The entire place were full of blood as most of them were hacked to death. At the police outpost two Bengali Hindu women were killed by Jiban Debbarma. After two hours, the injured were sent to GB hospital in a truck. Those who survived were given shelter across different schools of Agartala. Those events followed by curfews existing several months throughout the state. This incident marked the beginning of a sense of insecurities in both the communities that followed years and even today.

Investigation 
On 8 July 1980, the Ministry of Home Affairs set up the Dinesh Singh Committee to investigate into the Mandwi massacre.

References 

Massacres in India
Massacres in 1980
Ethnic cleansing in Asia
1980 in India
History of Tripura (1947–present)
Crime in Tripura
June 1980 events in Asia
Violence against Hindus in India
1980 murders in India
Massacres of Bengalis